The Men's 200m T12 had its first round held on September 14, beginning at 9:05. The Semifinals were held on September 15, at 10:38 and the A and B Finals were held on September 16 at 9:57.

Medalists

Results

References
Round 1 - Heat 1
Round 1 - Heat 2
Round 1 - Heat 3
Round 1 - Heat 4
Round 1 - Heat 5
Round 1 - Heat 6
Semifinals - Heat 1
Semifinals - Heat 2
Semifinals - Heat 3
Final A
Final B

Athletics at the 2008 Summer Paralympics